Newtons are a Nabisco-trademarked version of a pastry filled with sweet fruit paste. "Fig Newtons" are the most popular variety (fig rolls filled with fig paste). They are produced by an extrusion process.  Their distinctive shape is a characteristic that has been adopted by competitors, including generic fig bars sold in many markets.

The product was invented by Charles Roser and baked at the F. A. Kennedy Steam Bakery for the first time in 1891.

History 
Until the late 19th century, many physicians believed that most illnesses were related to digestion problems, and recommended a daily intake of biscuits and fruit. Fig rolls were the ideal solution to this advice. They were a locally produced and handmade product,  brought to the U.S. by British immigrants. That was until a Philadelphia baker and fig lover, Charles Roser, invented a process in 1891 which inserted fig paste into a thick pastry dough. Cambridgeport, Massachusetts–based Kennedy Biscuit Company purchased the Roser recipe and started mass production.

The first Fig Newtons were baked at the F. A. Kennedy Steam Bakery in 1891. The product was named after the city of Newton, Massachusetts.

The Kennedy Biscuit Company had recently become associated with the New York Biscuit Company, and the two merged to form Nabisco—after which, the fig rolls were trademarked as "Fig Newtons". Since 2012, the "Fig" has been dropped from the product name (now just "Newtons").

Varieties
Original Fig Newtons were the only variety available until the 1980s and as of 2012, Nabisco makes several varieties of the Newton, which, in addition to the original fig filling, include versions filled with apple cinnamon, strawberry, raspberry, cherry, blueberry and mixed berry. The Fig Newton also is sold in a 100% whole-grain variety and a fat-free variety. Fig Newton Minis have also been introduced. The fig bar is the company's third best-selling product, with sales of more than 700 million bars a year as of 2018.  In 2011, a crisp cookie was introduced in the United States named Newtons Fruit Thins, after being successfully marketed by Kraft in Canada as Lifestyle Selections, a variety of Peek Freans. The product line has since been discontinued.

References

External links

 
Newtons' Page on Kraft.com
 Fig Newton Jingle at NabiscoWorld.com

Fig dishes
Mondelez International brands
Nabisco brands
Products introduced in 1891

fr:Figolu